The Oxford class of technical research ships were a class of three World War II Liberty ships converted in the early 1960s to provide a seaborne platform for global eavesdropping on behalf of the National Security Agency. The ships of this class were similar to the  ships of the same era with the difference being that they were adapted from Victory ships.

Ships in class
Oxford class (Liberty ship type)
 • 1961–1969
 • 1963–1969
 • 1963–1969

See also
Spy ship

Research vessels of the United States Navy